The North Mount Lyell disaster (also known as the Mount Lyell disaster and North Mount Lyell fire) refers to a fire that broke out on 12 October 1912 at the Mount Lyell Mining and Railway Company operations on the West Coast of Tasmania, killing 42 miners. The mine had been taken over from the North Mount Lyell Company in 1903.

Events
Sometime between 11:15 and 11:30 am on 12 October the pump house on the  level of the mine was reported on fire. As the mine lacked an emergency warning system, those aware of the fire were forced to run along its levels and drives warning others. Of the 170 miners working in the mine, 73 managed to escape that first day. However many, including those who had been working in remote stopes, were trapped. Outside the mine, uncertainty surrounded the status of the fire and the number of miners remaining inside. Initial rescue attempts proved difficult, and repeated attempts to enter the mine failed.

The rescue plan involved the transportation of breathing equipment from one of the Victorian mining towns to Queenstown, via a speedy shipping across the Bass Strait and the alleged fastest times by engines on the Emu Bay Railway, the Government Strahan–Zeehan Railway line between Zeehan and Regatta Point, and from there by the Abt line to Queenstown. Also the train travelling times between Burnie and Queenstown were never bettered.

Once the rescue equipment arrived, rescuers were able to enter the mine. On the  level, a rescue party came across a group of deceased miners. One of these miners, a man named Joe McCarthy, had left a note pinned to a timber:

Seven hundred level. North Lyell mine, 12-10-12. 
If anyone should find this note convey to my wife.
Dear Agnes. - I will say good-bye. Sure I will not see you again any more.
I am pleased to have made a little provision for you and poor little Lorna.
Be good to our little darling.
My mate, Len Burke, is done, and poor old V. and Driver too.
Good-bye, with love to all.
Your loving husband, Joe McCarthy.

On 14 October, rescuers lowered  of rope with a signal gong attached to the end down the main shaft of the mine. Late in the afternoon, rescuers heard a rap of the line. When the rope was pulled up, a handkerchief wrapped around a tobacco tin was found attached to it. Inside the tin was a penciled note:

40 men in 40 stope. Send food and candles at once. No time to lose. J. Ryan

Following this discovery, rescue efforts intensified, and firemen were able to descend to the  level and rescue all the men trapped below. Rescue efforts lasted for four days with the last of the survivors brought to the surface more than 100 hours after the fire began.

Aftermath

As a result of the fire, initially 42 people died; the bodies were buried in unmarked graves in the Queenstown General cemetery. Initially, the first two bodies to be recovered were buried in the Linda Cemetery, however when the final victim (John Bourke) was recovered, the pair were buried at Queenstown at the same time as Bourke.

One of the miners, Albert Gadd, who escaped death and then re-entered the mine to assist in the rescue efforts, was hospitalised in Launceston and died on 20 February 1913 from carbon monoxide poisoning. Gadd, whose wife was delivered of a son two months later, can be regarded as the 43rd victim of the mining tragedy. He was posthumously awarded the Clarke Gold Medal from the Royal Humane Society in Melbourne. Silver medals were awarded to 30 rescuers, among them engineer Russell Mervyn Murray, later the mine's general manager.

Royal Commission
The royal commission that was held at the time of the retrieval of bodies after the fire, and despite various theories as to the cause of the fire, an open verdict remained.

Although Blainey covers the details of the disaster in The Peaks of Lyell, writing 40 years after the event, there were still variations upon the "official" versions of the event, amongst "old timers" in Queenstown.  Some of these are aired and detailed in Bradshaw's verbatim record of the newspaper reports and the royal commission, as well as being incorporated into Crawford's recent novel.

A number of themes arise from reading Blainey, and others on the subject: the rise of trade unionism on the west coast at the time, and the lack of preparedness for such disasters by the mining companies. Also one recurring theme in some of the stories was the rumour or suggestion of the presence of a woman disguised as a man working underground.

At the Centenary of the event at the Queenstown Heritage and Arts Festival Peter Schulze's book An Engineer Speaks of Lyell elaborates an argument that the most likely cause of the fire was an electrical fault as a result of faulty installation of the pump motor at the 700 ft level. Schulze, who had access to more documents than Blainey and the twin advantages of an electrical engineering background and mining experience, concludes that the Royal Commission process was manipulated to give a result that best suited the company, for whom an adverse finding could have been financially ruinous. It was especially at fault for naming the suspected arsonist, against whom there was no evidence apart from his prominence as a Union leader. He concedes that following the accident the Company followed best practice in mine management and labour relations.

Casualties
This list of victim details is compiled from the following sources:
Names - Archives Office of Tasmania Tasmanian inquest number 13222
Ages and places of origin - Queenstown Cemetery's records, these details completed by families of the deceased
Albert Gadd's information - Archives Office of Tasmania Tasmanian inquest number 13169.

Centenary
The Queenstown Heritage and Arts Festival of 2012 celebrated the centenary of this event. Part of the celebrations included a collection of songs entitled Fire Underground performed by The West Coast Singers, an ensemble of vocalists organized and directed by Kerrie Maguire. The West Coast Singers toured Tasmania with this concert in the following months, including performances at the Cygnet and Tamar Valley Folk Festivals in January 2013. The tour wrapped up with a performance at the Paragon Theatre, Queenstown in June 2013, on the 100th anniversary of the last funeral of the disaster's victims.

References

Further reading
 
First written in the early 1950s, Blainey had access to some people who were alive at the time of the disaster
  (Available at Galley Museum)

Primary sources
(in some parts Bradshaw has direct transcription from the Zeehan and Dundas Herald for similar dates)

  Archives Office of Tasmania. SC195/82 Inquest number 13222.
The Mercury 12 October 1912 – 10 June 1913.
The Examiner 12 October 1912 – 10 June 1913.
"Zeehan and Dundas Herald" p. 4.   14 January 1914.

External links
 Tasmania GenWeb (22 January 2000), Mount Lyell Disaster 1912

1912 in Australia
Mining disasters in Australia
Disasters in Tasmania
Fires in Australia
1912 fires in Oceania
Mount Lyell Mining and Railway Company
West Coast Range
1910s in Tasmania
1912 disasters in Australia